Shannon River is a river located in the Great Southern region of Western Australia.

The river rises in the forests to the west of Lake Muir and flows in a southerly direction, crossing the South Western Highway just east of Shannon then continuing south through the Shannon National Park before entering the Broke Inlet. The only tributary of the river is Fish Creek.

The water quality of the river is excellent, fresh and low in sediments. Sandbanks bar the mouth of the river where in enters the inlet.

References

Rivers of the Great Southern region
Warren bioregion